Panjar is a village/Union Council of Tehsil Kahuta of 
Rawalpindi District in the Punjab province of Pakistan. It is located at 33°39'0N 73°31'0E with an altitude of 795 metres (2611 feet).

References
 

Populated places in Rawalpindi Tehsil
Union councils of Rawalpindi Tehsil